Grupo Climax is a dance group from Veracruz, Veracruz, Mexico and was created by José-Antonio Fuentes-Atilano best known by his stage name DJ Oscar Lobo (also known as Oskar Lobo) in 2004. They released a very successful recording titled "La Mesa Que Más Aplauda" was originated with another artist Dj Mailo in collaboration to become the mega hit Za Za Za, which peaked at number one in the Billboard Top Latin Albums for five consecutive weeks.

References 

Dance music groups
Club DJs
Mexican DJs
People from Veracruz (city)
Mexican musical groups
Musicians from Veracruz
Electronic dance music DJs